November 18 - Eastern Orthodox liturgical calendar - November 20

All fixed commemorations below are observed on December 2 by Orthodox Churches on the Old Calendar.

For November 19, Orthodox Churches on the Old Calendar commemorate the Saints listed on November 6.

Saints

 Prophet Obadiah (Abdias) (9th century B.C.)
 Martyr Heliodorus in Pamphylia (273)
 Martyr Azes of Isauria, and with him 150 soldiers (284)
 Holy 12 soldier-martyrs.
 Martyr Barlaam of Caesarea in Cappadocia (304)
 Martyr Agapius of Caesarea in Palaestina (306)
 Martyrs Anthimus, Thalalaeus, Christopher, Euphemia and her children.  (see also: November 22)
 Martyr Pancharius.
 Venerables Barlaam (monk) and loasaph (prince of India), and St. Abenner the King, father of St. loasaph (4th century)
 Venerable Hilarion of Georgia, monk, Wonderworker of Thessalonica (875)
 Venerable Simon, Wonderworker of Calabria (10th century)

Pre-Schism Western saints

 Martyrs Severinus, Exuperius, and Felician, martyred in Vienne in France under Marcus Aurelius (170)
 Martyr Maximus, in Rome under Valerian (c. 255)
 Saint Crispin, Bishop of Écija in Andalusia in Spain, beheaded under Maximian Herculeus (4th century)
 Saint Anastasius II, Pope of Rome (498)  (see also: September 8 )
 Saint Patroclus of Bourges (577)
 Saint Ermenburgh (Domne Eafe), founder of the convent of Minster-in-Thanet (c. 700)
 Saint Egbert, Archbishop of York (766)
 Saint Medana, a holy virgin from Ireland who went to Scotland and lived in Galloway (8th century)
 Saint Tuto (Totto), founder in 764 of the monastery of Ottobeuren in Bavaria in Germany (815)
 Saint James of Sasseau, born in Constantinople, he came to France and was ordained in Clermont, later living as a hermit in Sasseau (c. 865)
 Saint Atto, first Abbot of Tordino near Teramo in Italy (c. 1010)

Post-Schism Orthodox saints

 Venerable Barlaam of Kiev, Abbot of the Kiev Caves (1065)
 Saint Philaret, Metropolitan of Moscow (1867)
 Saint Ioannicius, Schema-Archimandrite, of Glinsk Hermitage (1914)
 Saint Porphyriоs of Kapsokalyvia and Kallisa (1991)  (Old Style date see also: December 2 )

New martyrs and confessors

 New Hieromartyr John Vishnevsky, Priest (1920)
 New Hieromartyr Porphirius (Gulevich), Bishop of Simferopol and Crimea (1937)
 New Hieromartyr Ioasaph (Udalov), Bishop of Chistopol (1937) 

 New Hieromartyrs Sergius Mikhaev, Michael Dmitriev, Alexander Mishutin, John Malinovsky, Constantine Mikhailovsy, Alexander Serebrov, Ignatius Teslin, John Piramidin, Simeon Krivosheev, John Florovky, Jacob Briliantov, Demetrius Kuklin, Jacob Peredery, Priests (1937) 

 New Hieromartyrs Ioasaph Krimzin, Gennady Rebeza, Peter Mamontov, Gerasim Sukhov, Michael Kvanin, Martyr Valentine Kornienko, Peter Antonov, Leonid Salkov, Thimoty Kucherov (1937)

 Deacon-monk Antonius (Korzh) (1937)
 Hieromonk Bartholomeus (Ratnykh) (1937) 
 Priest Vladimir Pischulin (1937) 
 Archpriest Demetrius Kiranov (1937)
 Priest John Bliumovich (1937)
 Archpriest Nicholas Mezentsev (1937)
 Priest Timothy Izotov (1937)

 New Hiero-confessor Alexis (Kabaliuk), Schema-Archimandrite, of Khust (Carpatho-Russia) (1947)  (see also: December 2 )

Other commemorations

 Uncovering of the relics (1625) of Monk-martyr Adrian of Poshekhon, Abbot of Poshekhonye (1550)
 "The Joy of All who Sorrow" (1863) Icon of the Mother of God.
 Repose of Elder Cleopa (Ilie) of Sihastria, Romania (1998)

Icon gallery

Notes

References

Sources
 November 19 / December 2. Orthodox Calendar (PRAVOSLAVIE.RU).
 December 2 / November 19. Holy Trinity Russian Orthodox Church (A parish of the Patriarchate of Moscow).
 November 19. OCA - The Lives of the Saints.
 The Autonomous Orthodox Metropolia of Western Europe and the Americas (ROCOR). St. Hilarion Calendar of Saints for the year of our Lord 2004. St. Hilarion Press (Austin, TX). pp. 86-87.
 The Nineteenth Day of the Month of November. Orthodoxy in China.
 November 19. Latin Saints of the Orthodox Patriarchate of Rome.
 The Roman Martyrology. Transl. by the Archbishop of Baltimore. Last Edition, According to the Copy Printed at Rome in 1914. Revised Edition, with the Imprimatur of His Eminence Cardinal Gibbons. Baltimore: John Murphy Company, 1916. p. 357-358.
 Rev. Richard Stanton. A Menology of England and Wales, or, Brief Memorials of the Ancient British and English Saints Arranged According to the Calendar, Together with the Martyrs of the 16th and 17th Centuries. London: Burns & Oates, 1892. pp. 557-559.
Greek Sources
 Great Synaxaristes:  19 ΝΟΕΜΒΡΙΟΥ. ΜΕΓΑΣ ΣΥΝΑΞΑΡΙΣΤΗΣ.
  Συναξαριστής. 19 Νοεμβρίου. ECCLESIA.GR. (H ΕΚΚΛΗΣΙΑ ΤΗΣ ΕΛΛΑΔΟΣ). 
  19/11/2015. Ορθόδοξος Συναξαριστής. 
Russian Sources
  2 декабря (19 ноября). Православная Энциклопедия под редакцией Патриарха Московского и всея Руси Кирилла (электронная версия). (Orthodox Encyclopedia - Pravenc.ru).
  19 ноября по старому стилю / 2 декабря по новому . Русская Православная Церковь - Православный церковный календарь на 2018 год.

November in the Eastern Orthodox calendar